Hamilton is an elevated light rail station located over East Hamilton Avenue, after which the station is named, near its intersection with Creekside Way and California State Route 17, in Campbell, California. The station is owned by Santa Clara Valley Transportation Authority (VTA) and is served by the Green Line of the VTA light rail system. The station has a single track used by trains traveling in both directions.

History

Hamilton station was built as part of the Vasona Light Rail extension project.  This project extended VTA light rail service from the intersection of Woz Way and West San Carlos St in San Jose in a southwesterly direction to the Winchester station in western Campbell.

The official opening date for this station was October 1, 2005.

The construction of this station and the rest of the Vasona Light Rail extension was part of the 1996 Measure B Transportation Improvement Program.  Santa Clara County voters approved the Measure B project in 1996 along with a half-percent sales tax increase.  The Vasona Light Rail extension was funded mostly by the resulting sales tax revenues with additional money coming from federal and state funding, grants, VTA bond revenues, and municipal contributions.

Platforms and tracks

Hamilton station has a dramatic glass elevator enclosure and a distinctive pedestrian bridge that provides access to the platform and improves the station's aesthetics.

There is no public art currently on display at this station.

References

External links

Santa Clara Valley Transportation Authority light rail stations
Railway stations in the United States opened in 2005
2005 establishments in California